Cyrtopleura costata, or the angel wing clam, is a bivalve mollusc in the family Pholadidae. It is found in shallow parts of the northwest Atlantic and also in the North Sea of Scotland coastline and west coast of the Adriatic Sea by a remote area in the Marche region in central Italy, living in the seabed, where it digs its burrows on a very slow revolving movement for years through soft sand and mud always to a max depth of 8ft but always below  at the lowest tide.

Description
The anterior end is elongated and has a rounded point which is used for digging through the substrate. The posterior end is truncated and rounded and near the beak has an apophysis, a wing-like flange, which helps provide an attachment for the foot muscles. On the anterior side of the beak, the margin is smooth and bent slightly upwards. The whole valve has finely sculptured radial ribs which intercept with a series of concentric growth rings parallel with the margin. In the living animal, the valves are covered by the periostracum, a thin grey protective layer of protein which is part of the shell. This layer has usually been stripped away by sand and surf by the time that the empty shells are washed up on the beach, and the valves are usually found singly, because the muscles that hold them together are weak. Internally, the live mollusc has a powerful muscular foot and a pair of long, fused siphons. These siphons are unable to retract back into the shell and as a result, the two valves permanently gape apart.

Distribution
Cyrtopleura costata is found in shallow seas in the north east Atlantic Ocean between Cape Cod and the Gulf of Mexico. It is also found in the West Indies, Central America and as far south as Brazil. It is commonest in the intertidal zone and just below low water mark.

Biology
Cyrtopleura costata lives beneath the surface of the sea bed. It is able to bore through sand, mud, wood, clay and even soft rock using a twisting motion of its pointed, anterior end assisted by jets of water ejected from the mantle cavity. It is a filter feeder. The siphons extend to the surface of the substrate and water is drawn in through one and expelled through the other with microalgae and zooplankton being filtered out as the water passes through the gills. Respiration takes place at the same time. Cilia then waft the food particles to the mouth.

Spawning usually takes place in summer. Gametes are passed out of the exhalent siphon and fertilisation takes place externally. After hatching, eggs develop into veliger larvae which are planktonic. After 16 to 21 days these undergo metamorphosis into a pediveliger stage and settle out onto a soft substrate such as sand. There they become juveniles and start burrowing.

Uses
Cyrtopleura costata is used as food in Cuba and Puerto Rico. It is a fast-growing species, and it has been investigated for possible use in commercial aquaculture. Under optimal conditions it was found that the larvae were ready to undergo metamorphosis after 12 days, and settlement could be triggered by use of a dilute solution of epinephrine. The clams could reach a marketable size of  within 6 months.

References

Pholadidae
Molluscs described in 1758
Taxa named by Carl Linnaeus